Arabemys is an extinct genus of sea turtle. It was first named in 1999, and contains one species, A. crassiscutata. It is known from deposits of Late Paleocene or Early Eocene age near the village of Linah in northern Saudi Arabia.

References

External links
 Arabemys at the Paleobiology Database

Dermochelyidae
Eocene turtles
Paleocene turtles
Paleocene reptiles of Asia
Fossil taxa described in 1999
Eocene reptiles of Asia
Prehistoric turtle genera
Monotypic prehistoric reptile genera